Bingara (Aboriginal for 'creek') is a small town on the Gwydir River in Murchison County in the New England region of New South Wales, Australia. Bingara is currently the administrative centre for the Gwydir Shire that was created in 2003. The Gwydir River being a main highlight of the town is a main catchment of the Murray-Darling System.

Location
Bingara is located 141 km north of Tamworth, 54 km west of Inverell, 449 km north of Sydney and 358 km south west of Brisbane. Bingara is located very close to Myall Creek, the site of the massacre of 27 to 30 Indigenous Australians.

History
In 1827 Allan Cunningham crossed the Gwydir River near Bingara. At the time he mistook the river to be the Peel River, but realised his mistake on his return journey. The discovery of gold in 1852 brought prospectors to the area. In the 1880s, copper and diamonds were discovered also, causing a rapid development of the town. Bingara is one of the few places in Australia where diamonds have been found. In fact, Bingara was the largest producer of diamonds in Australia at that time. Bingara changed the spelling of its name from Bingera to Bingara in 1890. The first Bingera Post Office opened on 1 January 1853 and was renamed Upper Bingera in 1862 and closed in 1868. The second Bingera office opened in 1862 and was renamed Bingara in 1890.

Heritage listings 
Bingara has a number of heritage-listed sites, including:
 74 Maitland Street: Roxy Theatre and Peters Greek Cafe Complex
 Bingara Delungra Road, Myall Creek: Myall Creek Massacre and Memorial Site

Population
According to the 2016 census of Population, there were 1,428 people in Bingara. 82.7% of people were born in Australia and 88.2% of people only spoke English at home. The most common responses for religion were Anglican 38.6%, Catholic 16.8% and No Religion 15.2%.
 
It is a popular site for retirement with 57% of the population aged 55 years and over, compared to the national average of 27.6% and a median age of 61. The median weekly household income for Bingara is $743 which is lower than the national median of $1,438.

Sport
Bingara sporting life consists of the Bingara Bullets (rugby league), Gwydir River Rats (rugby union) and the Bingara District Cricket Association (cricket) with the representative team being Gwydir First XI. Notable sporting people include Andrew Hart (ex St George), sports broadcaster David Fordham, and Sydney jockey Adrian Robinson also originates from Bingara.

Climate
Bingara has a humid subtropical climate (Köppen: Cfa, Trewartha: Cfak/Cfal), with hot summers and cool winters.

Notable people
 Nate Butler
 Andrew Cowper
 John Fordham

References

External links

 www.bingara.com.au

Towns in New South Wales
Towns in New England (New South Wales)
Gwydir Shire
Mining towns in New South Wales